Charles Hamilton may refer to:

People in Canada
 Charles Hamilton (bishop) (1834–1919), Anglican bishop of Ottawa
 Charles Edward Hamilton (1844–1919), Canadian politician
 Sir Charles Hamilton, 2nd Baronet, of Trebinshun House (1767–1849), governor of the colony of Newfoundland
 Chuck Hamilton (born 1939), Canadian ice hockey player
 Charles James Hamilton (1855–1937), Conservative member of the Canadian House of Commons
 Charles McGill Hamilton (1878–1952), farmer and political figure in Saskatchewan

People in Great Britain and India
 Charles Hamilton (female husband) (born c. 1721–1724), woman who married while living as a man
 Charles Hamilton, 5th Earl of Abercorn (died 1701), Scottish peer
 Charles Hamilton, 5th Earl of Haddington (1650–1685), Scottish nobleman
 Charles Hamilton, 8th Earl of Haddington (1753–1828), Scottish nobleman
 Charles Hamilton, Lord Binning (1697–1732), Scottish politician
 Charles Hamilton, Count of Arran (1691-1754)
 Charles Hamilton (MP) (1704–1786), Member of Parliament for Truro
 Charles Powell Hamilton (1747–1825), Royal Navy admiral
 Charles Hamilton (orientalist) (1753?–1792), British East India Company soldier, known for his English translation of Al-Hidayah
 Sir Charles Hamilton, 1st Baronet (1845–1928), British Member of Parliament for Rotherhithe, 1885–1892
 Sir Charles John James Hamilton, 3rd Baronet (1810–1892), of the Hamilton baronets
 Sir Charles Edward Archibald Watkin Hamilton, 5th Baronet (1876–1939), a British convert to Islam
 Charles A. Hamilton, Administrator of the British Indian Ocean Territory, on List of colonial governors in 2005

People in the United States
 Charles H. Hamilton, one-time editor of the libertarian The Freeman journal
 Charles Memorial Hamilton (1840–1875), US Representative from Florida
 Charles Mann Hamilton (1874–1942), US Representative from New York, House minority whip
 Charles K. Hamilton (1881 or 1885–1914), pioneer American aviator
 Charles Smith Hamilton (1822–1891), Union army general during the American Civil War
 Charles Hadley Hamilton (1850–1915), Wisconsin lawyer and politician, son of Charles Smith Hamilton.
 Charles S. Hamilton (born 1952), US Navy admiral
 Col. Charles S. Hamilton (1882–1968), U.S. Army, of Washington, D.C.
 Charles Hamilton (rapper) (born 1987), American rapper
 Charles V. Hamilton (born 1929), political scientist and civil rights leader
 Charles Hamilton, Scarlett O'Hara's first husband and Melanie Hamilton's brother in Gone with the Wind
 Charles "Uncle Chucc" Hamilton, a member of the production and songwriting collective, 1500 or Nothin'

Others
 Charles Hamilton (writer) (1876–1961), used pen name Frank Richards
 Charles Iain Hamilton, naval historian at the University of the Witwatersrand, Johannesburg, South Africa
 Charles Hamilton (handwriting expert)

See also 
 Hamilton, Charles (album), an album by rapper Charles Hamilton 
 Charles Baillie-Hamilton (disambiguation)